Meidai may refer to:
  Nagoya University
  Meiji University